The St. Joe Missouri and North Arkansas Railroad Depot is a historic railroad station on the south side of United States Route 65 in the center of St. Joe, Arkansas.  It is a typical long rectangular building, with a gable-on-hip roof, and a telegrapher's booth projecting out the north (originally track-facing) side.  Built in about 1912 by the Missouri and North Arkansas Railroad, it is the only one of that railroad's wood-frame depots to survive in the state, and is the only railroad depot in Searcy County in its original location.  The town of St. Joe was incorporated in 1902 as a railroad town.

The building was listed on the National Register of Historic Places in 1993.

See also
National Register of Historic Places listings in Searcy County, Arkansas

References

Railway stations on the National Register of Historic Places in Arkansas
1912 establishments in Arkansas
Railway stations in the United States opened in 1912
National Register of Historic Places in Searcy County, Arkansas
Former railway stations in Arkansas